The 2018 Chooks-To-Go PSL Grand Prix Conference was the first conference and first indoor tournament for the Philippine Super Liga's sixth season. The games commenced February 17, 2018 at the Ynares Sports Arena in Pasig and the formal opening ceremony was held on February 24, 2018 at the Santa Rosa Multipurpose Complex in Santa Rosa, Laguna.

The tournament was moved from October to February in order to align with the new competition calendar approved by the International Volleyball Federation (FIVB) and the Asian Volleyball Confederation (AVC).

Teams

Preliminary round

Team standings

|}

All times are in Philippines Standard Time (UTC+08:00)

First round

|}

Second round

|}

Playoffs

Quarterfinals

|}

Semifinals
Best-of-three series

|}

Bronze match

|}

Finals
Best-of-three series

|}

Final standing

Individual awards

Venues
Main venues
 Ynares Sports Arena
 Filoil Flying V Centre
 Smart Araneta Coliseum (finals)

"Spike on Tour" venues
 Sta. Rosa Multipurpose Complex - Santa Rosa, Laguna (opening ceremonies)
 Strike Gymnasium - Bacoor, Cavite 
 Muntinlupa Sports Complex - Muntinlupa 
 Malolos Sports and Convention Center - Malolos, Bulacan 
 Imus Sports Complex - Imus, Cavite 
 Batangas Sports and Convention Center - Batangas City, Batangas 
 Baliwag Sports Center - Baliwag, Bulacan 
 Centennial Arena Laoag Coliseum - Laoag City, Ilocos Norte 
 Gen. Trias Sports Complex - General Trias, Cavite

Broadcast partners
ESPN 5: AksyonTV, Hyper (SD and HD), ESPN5.com

References

Grand Prix
PSL